Doqondar (also Romanized as Doqandar and Do Qondor; also known as Doghondar, Dowjāndār, Dūgandar, and Dūghandar) is a village in Madvarat Rural District, in the Central District of Shahr-e Babak County, Kerman Province, Iran. At the 2006 census, its population was 186, in 53 families.

References 

Populated places in Shahr-e Babak County